Woking is a hamlet in northwestern Alberta, Canada within Saddle Hills County. It is named for the town of Woking in Surrey, England.

It is located in the Peace River Country north of the Town of Sexsmith and south of the Village of Rycroft and the Town of Spirit River.

The hamlet is located in Census Division No. 19 and in the federal riding of Peace River.

Demographics 

See also 
List of communities in Alberta
List of designated places in Alberta
List of hamlets in Alberta
Woking, Surrey, United Kingdom

References 

Hamlets in Alberta
Designated places in Alberta
Saddle Hills County